Caerphilly County Borough is a county borough in the south-east of Wales. It is governed by Caerphilly County Borough Council.

Its main and largest town is Caerphilly. Other towns in the county borough are Bedwas, Risca, Ystrad Mynach, Newbridge, Blackwood, Bargoed, New Tredegar and Rhymney.

Geography
Caerphilly County Borough is in southeast Wales and straddles the border between the historic counties of Glamorgan and Monmouthshire. It is bordered by Cardiff to the southwest, Newport to the southeast, Torfaen to the east, Blaenau Gwent to the northeast, Powys to the north, Merthyr Tydfil to the northwest and Rhondda Cynon Taf to the west.

The northern part of the borough is formed by the broad expanse of the Rhymney Valley. The Rhymney River rises in the hills in the north and flows southwards for about thirty miles, looping round to the east just to the north of Caerphilly before reaching the Bristol Channel. Some of the larger towns are Bedwas, Risca, Ystrad Mynach, Newbridge, Blackwood, Bargoed, New Tredegar and Rhymney. The valley also includes the communities of Abertysswg, Fochriw, Pontlottyn, Tir-Phil, Brithdir, New Tredegar, Aberbargoed, Rhymney and Ystrad Mynach, and the towns of Bargoed and Caerphilly.

History
Located on the edge of the South Wales Coalfield this area was sparsely populated with livestock husbandry being the main occupation. Farmers in their remote farmhouses on the windswept pastures might dig themselves some bucketfuls of coal for their hearth. Things began to change with the development of the iron industry, the start of the Industrial Revolution. In 1752, a 99-year lease was granted for a parcel of land in the Rhymney Valley which gave the lessees the right to mine coal and iron ore. Other such transactions followed, pitshafts were dug and the coal industry developed. By the beginning of the twentieth century, there were forty coalmines in the valley.

One of the pits sunk in the late nineteenth century was the Elliot Colliery. At its peak before World War I, it was producing over a million tons of coal a year and employing nearly three thousand people. The coal eventually became depleted and the colliery closed in 1967. Most of the site was cleared but the East Winding House survives and is now a Grade II listed building, and a museum of the coal industry in the area has been opened on the site. All the pits in the valley were closed by the end of the twentieth century; the spoil heaps were removed and the area was landscaped so that it is not now apparent that the valley ever had an industrial past.

The county borough was formed on 1 April 1996 by the merger of the Rhymney Valley district of Mid Glamorgan with the Islwyn borough of Gwent. In 2008, as a result of representations from different communities in the borough, a draft plan was put forward proposing various changes to the borders between communities.

Education

Freedom of the Borough
The following people and military units have received the Freedom of the County Borough of Caerphilly.

Individuals
 Joseph Calzaghe : 17 May 2009.
 Lauren Price: 6 October 2021.
 Lauren Williams: 6 October 2021.

Military Units
 The Royal Welsh: 26 September 2010.
 The Royal British Legion: 25 March 2022.

See also
List of places in Caerphilly County Borough for a list of towns and villages

References

External links
 Caerphilly Council official website

 Menter Iaith Sir Caerffili the Welsh Language Initiative for Caerphilly County Borough
 Visit Caerphilly Tourism site by the local authority
 Caerphilly Observer Newspaper for the borough

 
Glamorgan
Principal areas of Wales
County boroughs of Wales
1996 establishments in Wales